Nazareno de Achaguas is a nineteenth-century wooden statue of Jesus Christ in the town of Achaguas, Venezuela. It was commissioned by José Antonio Páez. In 2014 it was given a heritage listing (Bien de Interés Cultural) by the Venezuelan Ministry of Culture.

See also
 List of statues of Jesus

External links

Statues of Jesus
Statues in Venezuela
Wooden sculptures in Venezuela